Vice Admiral Ferdinand Louis Reichmuth (April 11, 1881 – August 16, 1978) was an officer of the United States Navy who served in World War I and World War II.

Biography
Reichmuth was born in Beloit, Kansas, the son of Ferdinand G. C. Reichmuth and Johana Christiane "Clotilde" Graff, a German immigrant from Colleda, Thüringen.  He attended Ripon College, Ripon, Wisconsin, before his appointment to the United States Naval Academy from the state of Wisconsin in 1902.  While a midshipman he was a member of the rowing crew. He graduated in February 1906.

Early career

After graduation, Reichmuth was ordered to Asiatic Station, and served consecutively in the battleship  and the gunboat  until May 1908.  After serving the two years at sea then required by law he was commissioned as ensign in February 1908. Following brief duty on the store ship , with additional duty at the Naval Station, Guam, he was assigned permanent duty at that station in June 1908, and in September of that year became aide to the governor of Guam.  Detached from that assignment in January 1909, he rejoined the Supply, and in May of the same year was transferred to the armored cruiser , receiving promotion to lieutenant (j.g.) on February 13, and to lieutenant on October 11, 1911. He left the West Virginia in June 1912, spending the next two years in the Inspection Department of the Navy Yard at Mare Island, California.

World War I

In July 1914 Reichmuth joined the battleship  and was serving as gunnery officer when the United States entered World War I in April 1917. Transferred to the battleship  in September 1917, he served as gunnery officer, as she operated with the Atlantic Fleet.

Inter-war career

Reichmuth next reported for duty as force gunnery officer and aide on the staff of Vice Admiral William R. Shoemaker, USN, Commander, Battleship Force, Pacific Fleet, serving aboard the flagship . Reichmuth was promoted to commander on December 20, 1921. He was detached from his assignment in June 1923, to serve as inspector of ordnance in charge at the Naval Ammunition Depot, Mare Island, California, for the next two years.

In July 1925, Reichmuth reported for instruction at the Naval War College, Newport, Rhode Island, and after completing the senior course in June 1926 he returned to sea in command of the oiler .  In May 1927 he was transferred to command of Division 30, Destroyer Squadrons, Battle Fleet, with additional duty in command of the destroyer , serving in those commands until June 1928.  He then had duty as aide to the commandant, Twelfth Naval District, San Francisco, California, in connection with the Naval Reserve Affairs, until May 1931.

Having been promoted to the rank of captain on October 1, 1930, he assumed command of the transport , remaining there until April 1933. From May of that year until March 1936 he served as recruiting inspector, Western Division, San Francisco, California.

In March 1936, Reichmuth reported for duty as chief of staff and aide on the staff of Vice Admiral Clarence S. Kempff, USN, Commander Battleships, Battle Force, on his flagship West Virginia, continuing in that duty when Admiral Edward C. Kalbfus, USN, hoisted his flag in the West Virginia in January 1937, relieving Rear Admiral Kempff as Commander, Battleships, Battle Force, U.S. Fleet. In May of that year he reported for duty as captain of the Yard, Washington, D.C., and in July 1938 was assigned additional duty as assistant superintendent of the Naval Gun Factory at the Navy Yard, serving in that assignment until June 1940, achieving flag rank as rear admiral on May 1, 1940.

On June 20, 1940, Reichmuth assumed duty as Commander, Destroyers, Atlantic Squadron, with the destroyer  as his flagship. In November of that year he was transferred to duty as Commander, Destroyers, Patrol Force, with the cruiser  as flagship, with additional duty later in command of Destroyer Flotillas Nine and Eight. In February 1941 he continued in command when his group was redesignated, Destroyers, Atlantic Fleet and in July of that year was assigned additional duty as Commander, Destroyer Flotillas, 3, 4 and. 8.

World War II
On December 31, 1941, he was detached from those commands and designated Commander, Train, Atlantic Fleet, redesignated in February 1942 Commander, Service Force, Atlantic Fleet, with the temporary rank of vice admiral. Upon detachment from that command on August 22, 1942, he reverted to his permanent rank of rear admiral.

On September 15, 1942, Reichmuth assumed duty as commandant of the Washington Navy Yard and the Potomac River Naval Command. In November 1945, in accordance with General Order No. 227, abolishing the U.S. Navy Yard, Washington, D.C., he was designated superintendent, U.S. Naval Gun Factory, Washington, D. C., with additional duty as commandant, Potomac River Naval Command.

End of career
On January 28, 1946, Reichmuth was relieved as superintendent of the Naval Gun Factory, but continued his duty as commandant, Potomac River Naval Command.  He was ordered released from active duty on March 25, 1946, and placed on the Retired List of the Navy, as rear admiral. He was promoted to vice admiral on the Retired List, effective May 28, 1948.

Vice Admiral Reichmuth died in August 1978 in San Francisco, California.

Awards

Legion of Merit

Citation : "For exceptionally meritorious conduct in the performance of outstanding services to the Government of the United States as Commandant, Navy Yard, Washington, D.C., Commandant, Potomac River Naval Command, and Superintendent, United States Naval Gun Factory, September 15, 1942 to April 10, 1946.  Displaying foresight and initiative.  Rear Admiral Reichmuth organized and administered the large number of Naval Personnel assigned to the Washing-ten Area.  As Superintendent of the Naval Gun Factory, he was Instrumental in enlarging the production of his factory, and In training numerous personnel to guide the successful production elsewhere, In addition, he super-vised the design, development and construction of new arid improved guns and mounts, thereby contributing to the creation of a Navy second to none. His sound judgment high professional attainments and unwavering demotion to duty reflect the highest credit upon Rear Admiral Reichmuth and the United States Naval Service."

Victory Medal, Atlantic Fleet Clasp
American Defense Service Medal, Fleet Clasp
American Campaign Medal
War II Victory Medal

References

  "Z" Files, Navy Department Library, Navy Yard, Washington, D.C.
 "Navy: Stormy Man, Stormy Weather". Time. June 2, 1941.

1881 births
1978 deaths
People from Beloit, Kansas
United States Navy admirals
Ripon College (Wisconsin) alumni
United States Naval Academy alumni
Naval War College alumni
United States Navy personnel of World War I
United States Navy World War II admirals
Recipients of the Legion of Merit